Georgy Maximilianovich Malenkov ( – 14 January 1988) was a Soviet politician who briefly succeeded Joseph Stalin as the leader of the Soviet Union. However, at the insistence of the rest of the Presidium, he relinquished control over the party apparatus in exchange for remaining Premier and first among equals within the Soviet collective leadership. He then became embroiled in a power struggle with Nikita Khrushchev that culminated in his removal from the premiership in 1955 as well as the Presidium in 1957. 

Throughout his political career, Malenkov's personal connections with Vladimir Lenin significantly facilitated his ascent within the ruling Communist Party of the Soviet Union. By 1925, he was entrusted with overseeing the party's records. This brought him into contact with Stalin who had by then successfully consolidated power as General Secretary of the Communist Party of the Soviet Union to become the de facto leader of the Soviet Union. As a result of this association, Malenkov became heavily involved in Stalin's purges before later being given sole responsibility over the Soviet missile program during World War II. From 1946 to 1947, he chaired the Council of Ministers Special Committee on Rocket Technology. In order to secure his position as Stalin's favorite, he successfully discredited Marshal Georgy Zhukov and suppressed all glory associated with Leningrad during World War II so that Moscow maintained its image as the Soviet Union's sole cultural and political capital.Following Stalin's death on 5 March 1953, Malenkov temporarily emerged as the Soviet leader's undisputed successor by replacing him as both Chairman of the Council of Ministers (or Premier) and head of the party apparatus. However, only nine days later, the Politburo (then known as the Presidium) forced him to give up the latter position while letting him retain the premiership. Subsequently, Malenkov contented himself serving as the Presidium’s highest-ranking member and acting chairman until being eclipsed in early 1954 by the party's First Secretary, Nikita Khrushchev. By 1955, he was also forced to resign as Premier. After later organizing a failed palace coup against Khrushchev in 1957, Malenkov was expelled from the Presidium and exiled to Kazakhstan in 1957, before ultimately being expelled from the Party altogether in November 1961. He officially retired from politics shortly afterwards. After a short sojourn in Kazakhstan, he returned to Moscow and kept a low profile for the remainder of his life.

Early life and education
Malenkov was born in Orenburg in the Russian Empire. His paternal ancestors immigrated during the 18th century from the area of Ohrid in the Ottoman Rumelia Eyalet (present day North Macedonia). Some of them served as officers in the Russian Imperial Army. His father was a wealthy farmer in Orenburg province. Young Malenkov occasionally helped his father to do business selling the harvest. His mother was a daughter of a blacksmith and a granddaughter of an Orthodox priest.

Malenkov graduated from Orenburg gymnasium just a few months prior to the Russian revolution of 1917.

Career
In 1918, Malenkov joined the Red Army as a volunteer and fought alongside the Communists against White Russian forces in the Civil War. He joined the Communist Party of the Soviet Union (CPSU) in 1920 and worked as a political commissar on a propaganda train in Turkestan during the Civil War.

Communist Party

After the Russian civil war, Malenkov quickly built himself a reputation of a tough communist Bolshevik. He was promoted in the Communist party ranks and was appointed Communist secretary at the military-based Moscow Higher Technical School in the 1920s. Russian sources state that, rather than continuing with his studies, Malenkov took a career of a Soviet politician. His university degree was never completed, and his records have been indefinitely classified. Around this time, Malenkov forged a close friendship with Vyacheslav Malyshev, who later became chief of the Soviet nuclear program alongside Igor Kurchatov.

In 1924, Stalin noticed Malenkov and assigned him to the Orgburo of the Central Committee of the Soviet Communist Party. In 1925, Malenkov worked in the staff of the Organizational Bureau (Orgburo) of the Central Committee of the CPSU.

Malenkov was in charge of keeping records on the members of the Soviet communist party; two million files were made under his supervision during the next ten years. In this work Malenkov became closely associated with Stalin and was later heavily involved in the treason trials during the purging of the party. In 1938, he was one of the key figures in bringing about downfall of Yezhov, the head of the NKVD. In 1939, Malenkov became the head of the Communist party's Cadres Directorate, which gave him control over personnel matters of party bureaucracy. During the same year, he also became a member and a Secretary of the Central Committee and rose from his previous staff position to full member of the Orgburo. In February 1941, Malenkov became a candidate member of the Politburo.

World War II
After the German invasion of June 1941, Malenkov was promoted to the State Defense Committee (SDC), along with the NKVD chief Beria, Voroshilov, and Molotov with Stalin as the committee's head. This small group held total control over all the political and economic life in the country and Malenkov's membership thus made him one of the top five most powerful men in the Soviet Union during World War II. Between 1941 and 1943, Malenkov's primary responsibility in the SDC was supervising military aircraft production as well as supervising development of nuclear weapons. In 1943, he also became chairman of a committee that oversaw the post-war economic rehabilitation of some liberated areas with the exception of Leningrad.

Soviet nuclear missiles
Stalin gave Malenkov the task of building nuclear missiles in collaboration with Beria. Malenkov was appointed Chief of the Soviet Missile program, his first deputy was Dmitri Ustinov, a 33-year-old rocket scientist who later became one of the most powerful Soviet Defence Ministers. During World War II, Malenkov, Ustinov, and Mikhail Khrunichev started the Soviet missile and rocket program that soon absorbed the German missile industry. Malenkov supervised takeover of German V2 missile industry that was moved from Peenemünde to Moscow for further development that resulted in building Vostok missiles and orbiting Sputnik a few years later. At the same time, Malenkov followed Stalin's orders of building several space centers, such as Kapustin Yar near the Volga river and Khrunichev missile center in Moscow.

Malenkov's main role was supervising the top staff. He took a keen interest in recruiting the most talented young engineers and scientists produced by the university system. Instead of cross-examining candidates for their loyalty to the theoretical ideology of communism, Malenkov looked for team members with strong technical skills who could invent, improve, and manufacture munitions most quickly and efficiently. He downplayed the role of the omnipresent commissars who understood little technology but were charged with ideological purification. The long-run lesson was that economic growth was the nation's highest priority.

Defeating Zhdanovshchina
"Zhdanovshchina" was the emphasis on purified communist ideology developed during the Second World War by Andrei Zhdanov. It emerged from Zhdanov's debates inside the party hierarchy opposing Malenkov's pragmatist faction. Malenkov stressed universal values of science and engineering, and proposed to promote technological experts to the highest positions in the Soviet administrative elite. Zhdanov's faction said proper ideology trumped science and called for prioritizing political education and ideological purity. However the technocrats had proven amazingly successful during the war in terms of engineering, industrial production, and development of advanced munitions. Zhdanov sought to use the ideological purification of the party as a vehicle to restore the Kremlin's political control over the provinces and the technocrats. He worried that the provincial party bosses and the heads of the economic ministries had achieved too high a degree of autonomy during the war, when the top leadership realized the urgent need for maximum mobilization of human and material resources. The highest priority in the postwar era was physical reconstruction after the massive wartime destruction. The same argument that strengthened the technocrats continue to operate, and the united opposition of Malenkov, the technocrats, the provincial party bosses, and the key ministries doomed Zhdanov's proposals. He therefore pivoted to devote Zhdanovshchina to purification of the arts and culture.

Attack on Georgy Zhukov
Georgy Zhukov was the most prominent Soviet military commander during World War II, winning several critical battles, such as the Siege of Leningrad, the Battle of Stalingrad, and the Battle of Berlin. Stalin, Beria, and Malenkov grew suspicious of Zhukov, worrying he possessed capitalistic tendencies, because Zhukov established a friendship with General Dwight D. Eisenhower, invited the future American president to Leningrad and Moscow, and endorsed collaboration between the United States and the Soviet Union. At the conclusion of World War II and shortly thereafter, Malenkov sided against several who were considered Soviet war heroes, among them Zhukov, Rokossovsky, and several other popular generals. Malenkov's accusations against Zhukov were mostly based upon allegations of counter-revolutionary behavior and selfish "Bonapartism". Soon Zhukov was demoted in rank and moved to a lower position in Odessa where his only foes were local Party forces. Zhukov had his first heart attack not long after, and Malenkov's concerns about him largely faded.

After the ruthless attack on Zhukov, Malenkov gained strength and became closer to Stalin and several other top communists. In 1946, Malenkov was named a candidate member of the Politburo. Although temporarily trailing behind his rivals Andrei Zhdanov and Lavrentiy Beria, he soon came back into Stalin's favor, especially after Zhdanov's mysterious death in 1948. That same year, Malenkov became a Secretary of the Central Committee.

Competitors, Leningrad affair

During the late 1940s and early 1950s Malenkov gained more favor with Stalin than any other top Soviet communist. Malenkov's main competition were the leaders of Leningrad whose glory had been earned in resistance to Hitler's attacks during World War II. After the Siege of Leningrad Mayor Kuznetsov and his deputies earned much fame and support all over the USSR. Malenkov followed Stalin's policy of suppressing that glory in order to maintain Moscow's image as the USSR's only center of power. In 1949, Malenkov personally came to Leningrad leading a regiment of armed men from Moscow MGB special forces and swiftly removed and arrested the city leaders. After a series of secret trials, 23 men, including the Mayor and deputies, were executed and buried in an unmarked pit on the outskirts of the city. At the same time, over two thousand top managers and intellectuals were uprooted and exiled from Leningrad to Siberia, their property was confiscated, and their positions were filled by communists loyal to Stalin.

During the same years, Malenkov also exterminated the Jewish Anti-Fascist Committee. Many members of the Jewish Anti-Fascist Committee were killed in the Night of the Murdered Poets. On 12 August 1952, thirteen Jewish writers were executed for treason in the basement of Lubyanka Prison. This was approved by Stalin and supervised by Malenkov.

Malenkov's loyalty to Stalin was proven by executions of political competition and the Leningrad affair and catapulted Malenkov to become the only successor of Stalin.

1952 and 1953 Time magazine covers indicate that Malenkov was generally considered to be Stalin's apprentice and successor.

Premiership and duumvirate

Malenkov's ambitions and crafty politics bore fruit upon Stalin's death on 5 March 1953. Four days later Malenkov, Vyacheslav Molotov, Lavrentiy Beria, and Nikita Khrushchev gave the eulogy at Stalin's funeral.

On 6 March, the day after Stalin died, Malenkov succeeded him as Premier of the Soviet Union. His name was also listed first on the newly named Presidium of the Central Committee (as the Politburo had been called since 1952). Although there had been no title identifying the leader of the party for almost a year, this indicated that Malenkov had succeeded Stalin as party leader as well. On 7 March, Malenkov's name appeared atop the list of secretaries of the Secretariat, confirming that he had succeeded Stalin as the most powerful man in the Soviet Union. However, after only a week, Malenkov was forced to resign from the Secretariat. The new leadership wanted to prevent too much power from being concentrated in one pair of hands. For all intents and purposes, Khrushchev replaced him as party leader; Khrushchev's name appeared atop a revised list of secretaries on 14 March, though he was not formally named First Secretary of the CPSU until September 1953. Malenkov remained as premier, beginning a period of a Malenkov-Khrushchev duumvirate.

Malenkov retained the office of premier for two years. During this time his political activities were mixed with a power struggle within the Kremlin. Still a staunch Stalinist, Malenkov expressed his opposition to research and development of nuclear armament, and inaugurated an international peace campaign against the use of nuclear weapons in 1953, declaring "a new world war ... with modern weapons means the end of world civilization." In debates on diplomacy, he always took the peaceful line. 

On economic issues, Malenkov advocated refocusing the economy on production of consumer goods at the expense of heavy industry, with the goal of elevating the standards of living in the Soviet Union. Malenkov also advocated for an agriculture policy that included tax cuts for peasants, increase in the price paid to the Kolkhozes by the state for grains, and incentives for peasants to cultivate their private plots. These policies were put in place during Malenkov's premiership and duumvirate, but did not meet their objectives and were very expensive, which led Malenkov's influence to decline.

Downfall and final years

Malenkov was forced to resign in February 1955 after he came under attack for abuse of power and his close connection to Beria (who had been executed as a traitor in December 1953). He was held responsible for the slow pace of reforms, particularly when it came to rehabilitating and freeing political prisoners (in comparison, Khrushchev made considerable efforts in this endeavor). His economic program of prioritizing light industry was subsequently abandoned in favor of increasing investments into heavy industry in the 1955 federal budget.

For two more years, Malenkov remained a regular member of the Presidium. Together with Khrushchev, he flew to the island of Brioni (Yugoslavia) on the night of 1–2 November 1956 to inform Josip Broz Tito of the impending Soviet invasion of Hungary scheduled for 4 November.

However, in 1957, Malenkov organized an attempt at a coup against Khrushchev. In a dramatic standoff in the Kremlin, both Khrushchev and Georgy Zhukov (who had the backing of the Soviet Army) turned against Malenkov. Malenkov's attempt failed and he, together with two other prominent co-conspirators, Vyacheslav Molotov and Lazar Kaganovich, who were characterized by Khrushchev at an extraordinary session of the Party Central Committee as the "Anti-Party Group", were dismissed from the Politburo. In 1961, Malenkov was expelled from the Communist Party and exiled to Kazakhstan. He became a manager of a hydroelectric plant in Ust'-Kamenogorsk in Kazakhstan.

After his exile and eventual expulsion from the Party, Malenkov first fell into obscurity and suffered from depression due to loss of power and the quality of life. Malenkov subsequently found his demotion and dismissal a relief from the pressures of the Kremlin power struggle throughout the 1950s. Malenkov in his later years converted to Russian Orthodoxy, as did his daughter, who has since spent part of her personal wealth building two churches in rural locations. Orthodox Church publications at the time of Malenkov's death said he had been a reader (the lowest level of Russian Orthodox clergy) and a choir singer in his final years.

Personal life
In 1920, in Turkestan, Malenkov started living together with Soviet scientist Valeriya Golubtsova (15 May 1901 – 1 October 1987), daughter of Aleksei Golubtsov, former State Councilor of the Russian Empire in Nizhny Novgorod and dean of the Imperial Cadet School. Golubtsova and Malenkov never officially registered their union and remained unregistered partners for the rest of their lives. She had a direct connection to Vladimir Lenin through her mother; one of the "Nevzorov sisters" who were apprentices of Lenin and studied together with him for years, long before the Revolution. This connection helped both Golubtsova and Malenkov in their communist career. Later Golubtsova was the director of the Moscow Power Engineering Institute, a centre for nuclear power research in USSR.  They had two sons and one daughter.

Death
Georgy Malenkov died on 14 January 1988 at Moscow at the age 86. He was buried at Kuntsevo Cemetery.

Honours and awards
30 September 1943:  
Hero of Socialist Labour
Order of Lenin
1945: Order of Lenin (second)
1952:  Order of Lenin (third)

Foreign assessments
The 1952 Time magazine cover shows Malenkov embraced by Stalin. In 1954, a delegation of the British Labour Party (including former Prime Minister Clement Attlee and former Secretary of State for Health Aneurin Bevan) was in Moscow. Sir William Goodenough Hayter, British Ambassador to the Soviet Union, asked for a meeting with Nikita Khrushchev, then General Secretary of the Communist Party of the Soviet Union. Much to Hayter's surprise, not only did Khrushchev accept the proposal, but he decided to attend in the company of Vyacheslav Molotov, Anastas Mikoyan, Andrey Vyshinsky, Nikolay Shvernik, and Malenkov. 

Such was the interest aroused in British political circles by this event that Sir Winston Churchill subsequently invited Sir William Hayter down to Chartwell so as to provide a full account of what had transpired at the meeting. Malenkov seemed "easily the most intelligent and quickest to grasp what was being said" and said "no more than he wanted to say". He was considered an "extremely agreeable neighbour at the table" and was thought to have had a "pleasant, musical voice and spoke well-educated Russian". Malenkov even recommended, quietly, that British diplomatic translator Cecil Parrott should read the novels of Leonid Andreyev, an author whose literature was at that time labeled as decadent in the USSR. Nikita Khrushchev, by contrast, struck Hayter as being "rumbustious, impetuous, loquacious, free-wheeling, and alarmingly ignorant of foreign affairs". 

Hayter thought that Khrushchev seemed "incapable of grasping Bevan's line of thought", and that Malenkov had to explain matters to him in "words of one syllable". Convinced that Malenkov was in charge, nobody in the British delegation felt much inclined to expend effort with Khrushchev. Malenkov "spoke the best Russian of any Soviet leader I have heard", his "speeches were well constructed and logical in their development", and he seemed "a man with a more Western-orientated mind".

Portrayals
Jeffrey Tambor played Malenkov in the 2017 satirical film The Death of Stalin, in which Malenkov is portrayed as naive and meek, contrary to reports of British diplomats.

Notes

References

Further reading
Dallin, David, Soviet foreign policy after Stalin (1961) online
Ebon, Martin, Malenkov:  Stalin's Successor (NY: McGraw-Hill, 1953)
Johanna, Granville, The First Domino: International Decision Making During the Hungarian Crisis of 1956, Texas A & M University Press, 2004.

External links

Georgy Malenkov Archive at marxists.org
"Number 2½", Time, 20 March 1950.

1901 births
1988 deaths
People from Orenburg
People from Orenburgsky Uyezd
Bolsheviks
Politburo of the Central Committee of the Communist Party of the Soviet Union members
Heads of government of the Soviet Union
First convocation members of the Soviet of the Union
Second convocation members of the Soviet of the Union
Third convocation members of the Soviet of the Union
Fourth convocation members of the Soviet of the Union
Members of the Supreme Soviet of the Russian Soviet Federative Socialist Republic, 1938–1947
Members of the Supreme Soviet of the Russian Soviet Federative Socialist Republic, 1947–1951
Members of the Supreme Soviet of the Russian Soviet Federative Socialist Republic, 1951–1955
Members of the Supreme Soviet of the Russian Soviet Federative Socialist Republic, 1955–1959
Russian communists
Russian Orthodox Christians from Russia
Soviet military personnel of the Russian Civil War
Heroes of Socialist Labour
Recipients of the Order of Lenin
Burials at Kuntsevo Cemetery